The Kenley Players was an Equity summer stock theatre company which presented hundreds of productions featuring Broadway, film, and television stars in Midwestern cities between 1940 and 1996.  Variety called it the "largest network of theaters on the straw hat circuit."  Founded by and operated for its entire lifespan by John Kenley, it is credited with laying the groundwork for Broadway touring companies.

The company's success was predicated on booking big-name stars for their box office potential, casting them in familiar plays and musicals, and keeping prices low, thereby attracting large crowds.  In its heyday, Kenley Players productions drew crowds of 5,000 in Dayton, Akron, Columbus, Flint, Michigan, and Warren, Ohio. Kenley "pioneered the notion of putting TV stars in summer stock." In a 1950 interview Kenley told The Washington Post, "I only charge $1.50 top...I'd rather have full houses every night than be stuck with a batch of empty seats."

Headliners included Tallulah Bankhead, Cyd Charisse, Rosemary Clooney, Olivia de Havilland, Veronica Lake, Gypsy Rose Lee, Arthur Godfrey, Rudy Vallée, Tommy Tune, Burt Reynolds, Ethel Merman, Mae West, Billy Crystal, William Shatner, Betty White, Florence Henderson, Mickey Rooney, Roddy McDowall, Marlene Dietrich, Jayne Mansfield, Rock Hudson and Gloria Swanson. Those who appeared in more than five productions included Edie Adams, Ed Ames, Vivian Blaine, Mitzi Gaynor, Vincent Price, Genevieve, Robert Goulet, Lois Hunt, Van Johnson, Carol Lawrence, Paul Lynde, Gordon MacRae, Ann Miller, Karen Morrow, John Raitt, Martha Raye, Alexis Smith, Betty White, Barry Williams, and Earl Wrightson. In 1972, 1973, and 1975, Karen Valentine appeared in Columbus, Ohio. In 1978, Sue Ane Langdon appeared in Chicago in Columbus, Ohio. 

Backstage called the Kenley Players "a legendary summer stock circuit." Playbill called it "for decades, a renowned midwestern summer stock outfit."  During the period The Phil Donahue Show was broadcast from Dayton, celebrities appearing in Kenley productions appeared regularly, giving Kenley national publicity.

References

External links
 List of Kenley Players Headliners

Theatre companies in Ohio